Parugo Parugu is a 1994 Indian Telugu-language comedy film, produced by Sudhakar under the Satyadev Movie Makers banner and directed by Relangi Narasimha Rao. It stars Rajendra Prasad and Sruthi, with music composed by Raj–Koti. The film is based on Malik's novel of the same name. It was a box-office bomb.

Plot 
Rambabu (Rajendra Prasad) is a flawed photographer who opens a photo studio along with an assistant Kittigadu (Ananth). After some time, he falls for a charming girl Saroja (Sruthi) and her guidance, makes Rambabu a perfectionist. Once Neelima (Deepika) the close friend of Saroja visits Rambabu's studio to learn regarding an automatic camera. During the process, unfortunately, Neelima collapses and a picture is captured when Rambabu catches hold of her. Parallelly, Ranganatha Rao (Chalapathi Rao) Neelima's husband is a smuggler whom she always warns him to cease his crimes. So, he slaughters her through his henchmen Veeru (Giri Babu) & Jaggu (Pradeep Shakthi) when Jackal (Dharmavarapu Subramanyam) another henchman of Ranganatha Rao captures a photograph as he is always disdained by him. Right now, Rambabu decides to participate in a photography competition for which he acquires the number of pictures and while developing he notices the corpse of Neelima in one of it. Immediately, Rambabu informs Police, but sadly, he is indicted in the crime by Ranganatha Rao with a photograph. But he successfully absconds and decides to nab the real murderer. Soon, he recognizes Ranganatha Rao as the culprit and follows him along with Kittugadu. Thereupon, they spot Jackal blackmailing Ranganatha Rao & his men by showing the photograph. So, they slay out him, before dying, Jackal swallows the negative. Here, the negative in his stomach is the only proof for Rambabu's innocence, so, he carries the dead body and starts running. One side Ranganatha Rao, another side Police are run after them. In the climax, all of them reach a theater where they play a spoof stage play of the Mahabharata. At last, the truth is revealed by removing the negative from the Jackal's stomach. Finally, the movie ends on a happy note with the marriage of Rambabu & Saroja.

Cast 

Rajendra Prasad as Rambabu
Sruthi as Saroja
Brahmanandam as Simha Swapnam
Sudhakar as Special appearance
Gollapudi Maruti Rao as Saroja's father
Allu Ramalingaiah as Parandhamaiah
Padmanadham Kirana stores owner
Giri Babu as Veeru
Chalapathi Rao as Ranganatha Rao
Mallikarjuna Rao as S. I. Appalakonda
Dharmavarapu Subramanyam as Jackal
Pradeep Shakthi as Jaggu
Chinna as Constable
Gundu Hanumantha Rao as Koyadora
Ananth as Kittigadu
Garimalla Visweswara Rao as Nakkaraju
Kaasi Viswanath as Hotel Manager
Krishna Chaitanya as Hotel Server
Kallu Chidambaram
Disco Shanthi as Veeramma
Hema as Hema
Dubbing Janaki as Rambabu's mother
Deepika as Neelima

Soundtrack 
Music composed by Raj–Koti. Lyrics were written by Jonnavithhula.

References

External links 
 

Films based on Indian novels
Films directed by Relangi Narasimha Rao
Films scored by Raj–Koti
Indian black comedy films
Indian comedy films